Simon Piers Ireland (born 23 November 1971, in Barnstaple) is a former professional footballer and current first-team coach at Sheffield Wednesday. He played as a midfielder for Huddersfield Town, Wrexham, Blackburn Rovers, Mansfield Town, Doncaster Rovers and Boreham Wood.

Coaching career
In January 2008, Ireland was appointed as assistant director, with responsibility for the U9-U12 age groups at Blackburn Rovers. From 2010 to 2013, he worked as the U18 assistant academy manager. In August 2013, he then became the U21 manager of Brighton & Hove Albion. After 18 months, Ireland left to join Queens Park Rangers as the academy's new head of coaching and coach education on 14 February 2015. After almost three years, he left on 18 January and a few days later, he joined the staff of Aitor Karanka at Nottingham Forest as a first team coach. Ireland faced his first game as manager the following day against Reading which he lost 0–2. On 15 January 2019, Martin O'Neill was appointed as the new manager and Ireland therefore continued as a member of the staff.

On 6 August 2021, Ireland joined Darren Moore as a first-team coach at Sheffield Wednesday.

References

External links

1971 births
Living people
Sportspeople from Barnstaple
English footballers
Premier League players
English Football League players
Association football midfielders
Huddersfield Town A.F.C. players
Wrexham A.F.C. players
Blackburn Rovers F.C. players
Mansfield Town F.C. players
Doncaster Rovers F.C. players
Boreham Wood F.C. players
Blackburn Rovers F.C. non-playing staff
Queens Park Rangers F.C. non-playing staff
Sheffield Wednesday F.C. non-playing staff
Nottingham Forest F.C. managers
English football managers